A Very Special Christmas is the first in the A Very Special Christmas series of Christmas-themed compilation albums produced to benefit the Special Olympics. The album was released on October 12, 1987, and production was overseen by Jimmy Iovine for A&M Records. A Very Special Christmas has raised millions of dollars for the Special Olympics.  The cover artwork was designed by Keith Haring.

On January 16, 1998, the album was certified quadruple platinum by the Recording Industry Association of America for shipment of four million copies in the United States.

As of November 2014, A Very Special Christmas is the 19th best-selling Christmas/holiday album in the United States during the SoundScan era of music sales tracking (March 1991 – present), having sold 2,520,000 copies according to SoundScan.

Track listing

 First pressings of the album contain a spoken introduction on The Pretenders' "Have Yourself a Merry Little Christmas", presumably by a child. This introduction was later omitted, shortening the track by about 13 seconds.
 Starting in 1992, "Back Door Santa" was replaced by another Bon Jovi song, "I Wish Everyday Could Be Like Christmas", which originally appeared as a B-side on their single "Keep the Faith".

References

External links
 
 How a 1987 Christmas album changed the way the holiday sounds
  A Very Special Christmas archived from Special Olympics site

1987 Christmas albums
Albums produced by Jimmy Iovine
1987 compilation albums
A&M Records compilation albums
A Very Special Christmas
Various artists albums
Albums with cover art by Keith Haring